Lisa Berkowitz (born 1952) is an American bridge player. She is from Old Tappan, New Jersey.

Bridge accomplishments

Wins

 North American Bridge Championships (17)
 Rockwell Mixed Pairs (2) 1986, 1987 
 Whitehead Women's Pairs (1) 2009 
 North American Pairs (1) 1995 
 Machlin Women's Swiss Teams (2) 1992, 2008 
 Wagar Women's Knockout Teams (3) 1990, 1999, 2009 
 Sternberg Women's Board-a-Match Teams (3) 1986, 1988, 1997 
 Chicago Mixed Board-a-Match (5) 1986, 1993, 1995, 1998, 2002

Runners-up

 North American Bridge Championships
 Freeman Mixed Board-a-Match (2) 2011, 2014 
 Wagar Women's Knockout Teams (2) 1985, 1994

Notes

Living people
American contract bridge players
1952 births
Place of birth missing (living people)
Date of birth missing (living people)
People from Old Tappan, New Jersey